Visitors to Barbados must obtain a visa at one of the Barbadian diplomatic missions unless they come from one of the visa exempt countries.


Visa policy map

Visa exemption

Holders of passports issued by the following 180 countries and territories do not require a visa to visit Barbados:

In addition, nationals of  holding a Titre de Voyage issued by the United Kingdom do not require a visa for stays of up to 28 days.

Diplomatic, official and service passports
Holders of diplomatic or service/official passports issued to nationals of Haiti do not require a visa for Barbados.

Transit
Holders of passports issued by any country can transit through Barbados for 12 hours, except for nationals of Algeria, who must obtain a transit visa.

See also

 Visa requirements for Barbadian citizens

References 

Barbados
Foreign relations of Barbados